Parliamentary elections were held in Egypt on 3 January 1950, with a second round on 10 January. In the parliament of 319-seats, 225 went to the Wafd Party, 28 to the Saadist Institutional Party, 26 to the Liberal Constitutional Party, and 40 to minor parties and independents.

Results

References

Egypt
1950 in Egypt
Elections in Egypt
January 1950 events in Africa
Election and referendum articles with incomplete results